Raimundo Arruda Sobrinho (1 August 1938 – 22 December 2020) was a Brazilian poet and writer.  Born in a rural area of Goiás on 1 August 1938, he moved to São Paulo at the age of 23 where he worked as a gardener and a book seller.  In the late 1970s, early 1980s, nearly at the end of the military dictatorship of Brazil, he became homeless, and this lasted for nearly 35 years.  During this period he wrote several poems and short stories, but they remained unknown until they were discovered by Shalla Monteiro in April 2011, and through Facebook Stories in the early 2014.
On 22 December 2020, Shalla announced Raimundo's passing on his dedicated Facebook page.

References

External links

 

1938 births
2020 deaths
20th-century Brazilian poets
Brazilian male writers
Brazilian male poets
Homeless people
Gardeners
People from Goiás
Writers from São Paulo
21st-century Brazilian poets
Place of birth missing